The Bavarian State Office for Monument Protection (BLfD) is the Bavarian central state authority for the protection of historical monuments. It is responsible for the conservation of both historic buildings as well as heritage sites and their archaeology.

References

External links 

 Bayerisches Landesamt für Denkmalpflege (BlfD)
 BayernViewer-Denkmal, digital monument list, Bayernkarte online map with monument locations
 Bavarian Monument Protection Act of 1973 (pdf, 13 pp., 140 kB)
 www.behoerdenwegweiser.bayern.de Mission and tasks of the BLfD

Archaeological organizations
Organisations based in Munich
Government of Bavaria
Historic preservation in Germany
Culture of Bavaria
Government agencies established in 1908
Heritage registers in Germany